Tamara Erin Klicman (born July 8, 1974), known professionally as  Tami Erin, is an American actress, model, singer, and fashion designer. She is best known for her role as Pippi Longstocking in the 1988 movie The New Adventures of Pippi Longstocking.  It was released in movie theaters worldwide in 13 languages by Columbia Pictures.

Acting and modeling 

Erin began acting and modeling at eight years old after becoming an Elite Model with Elite Model Management. Erin took method acting, singing, dancing, and gymnastics. Erin grew up in Wheaton, Illinois, but when she was nine years old her family moved to Miami, Florida.

Erin auditioned for the role of Pippi Longstocking when she was eleven years old and won the part out of over 8,000 girls.

The film's director, Ken Annakin, described her personality as a good fit for the role: "Tami radiates sunshine. When she smiles everyone is happy. She is Pippi Longstocking.".

Erin also appeared in the "Chrimbus Special" episode of Tim & Eric's Awesome Show, Great Job!.

Philanthropy

In 1988 Tami Erin was appointed as a United Nations Ambassador for UNICEF. Highlights included speaking at World Children's Day at the United Nations, New York City to the delegates of over 100 countries in the general assembly hall. Further, Erin became an International Ambassador for Hearts.com to raise funds for the IHeart Change program for six international charities including Generosity Water, Pencils of Promise, Eden Projects, International Lifeline Fund, Free The Slaves, and Kili To Chili.

Personal life
In October 2013, Erin sold a sex tape to a pornography company titled Tami Erin The SEX Tape. In 2020 at the beginning of the Covid-19 pandemic Tami Erin married her good friend Tommy Parker. They live in Grand Lake (Oklahoma)

Filmography

Film

Television

References

External links
 Tami Erin
 
 

1974 births
American female models
American film actresses
American voice actresses
Actresses from the San Francisco Bay Area
Living people
American child actresses
Actresses from Illinois
Actors from Wheaton, Illinois
UNICEF Goodwill Ambassadors
20th-century American actresses
21st-century American actresses
Female models from Illinois
Philanthropists from Illinois